"Lawyers in Love" is the first single and title track of Jackson Browne's 1983 album of the same name, Lawyers in Love. Though not as successful as Browne's previous single "Somebody's Baby", nonetheless at #13 it became Browne's fourth-highest peaking hit on the Hot 100 as well as his final top 20 hit on the American pop charts, while in Canada peaking on RPM at #13.  Browne wrote most of the songs on the album, including the title track.

History

The music video for "Lawyers in Love" took the title phrase and created a series of visual images surrounding it, especially themed on the Cold War.  Browne played at least two  parts, one as a yuppie-ish lawyer and one as an ordinary man wearing a white T-shirt, blue jeans, and a pair of black hi-top Converse Chuck Taylor All-Stars, sitting in a catatonic state in front of a television, unable to assimilate the world's events.

Some analysts later saw "Lawyers in Love" as an evolving "bridge" between Browne's personal works and his 1980s' political works. Others saw it as dry commentary on American social mores and something of a scathing critique of the conservativism and materialism of the Ronald Reagan era, something that had been present in Browne's work as far back as "Take It Easy".  "As probing (and hysterical) a dissection of cold-war politics in the Reagan era as the mainstream will allow," Jimmy Guterman wrote of the song in Rolling Stone in 1986.

Christopher Connelly, in reviewing the album for Rolling Stone in 1983, paid extra attention to the title track, writing that "in 'Lawyers in Love,' God's interplanetary travelers discover Americans 'waiting for World War III,' shoveling down fast food in front of the television. All told, it's an unusually whimsical lyric from a man not noted for his sense of humor." As for the music, Connelly called the song "Browne's headiest track to date: a solid keyboard-and-guitar attack flavored by a chanting falsetto figure, a church-organ swell, sha-la-la backup vocals, even an old-fashioned modulation out of the middle eight."

Cash Box called the song "a fine effort and an 'ooh-la-la' chorus to boot," and praised the "thundering '60s guitar."

Personnel
Credits are adapted from the liner notes of The Very Best of Jackson Browne.
Jackson Browne – lead vocals, rhythm guitar
Craig Doerge – piano, synthesizers
Bob Glaub – bass guitar, additional guitars
Doug Haywood – Hammond organ, harmony vocals
Danny Kortchmar – arrangements 
Russ Kunkel – drums
Rick Vito – lead guitar, harmony vocals

Charts

References

1983 singles
1983 songs
Asylum Records singles
Jackson Browne songs
Songs written by Jackson Browne
Song recordings produced by Jackson Browne